Grace Gao may refer to:

 Grace Gao (badminton) (born 1989), Canadian badminton player
 Grace Gao (activist) (born 1993), Chinese human rights activist
 Grace Gao, in the List of Numéro China cover models